The European Athletics U23 Championships is a biennial athletics competition for European athletes under the age of 23, which is organized by the European Athletic Association. The oldest of the 'age-group' track and field events held by European Athletics - European Athletics U20 Championships (previously called 'Junior Championships') are held in the same odd numbered years, while the European Athletics U18 Championships, previously the 'Youth Championships' are held in even numbered years.

The event was first held in 1997 and was a replacement for the European Athletics U23 Cup – a biennial event which had "A" and "B" level leagues that was held in 1992 and 1994.

Editions

European Athletics U23 Cup

European Athletics U23 Championships

Championships records

Men

Women

All-time medal table 
Medal table includes 1997–2021 Championships.

References

External links 
 

 
U23
Under-23 athletics competitions
Continental athletics championships
Biennial athletics competitions